The C&C 29-2, also called the C&C 29 Mark II, is a Canadian  sailboat that was designed by Cuthbertson & Cassian as a Midget Ocean Racing Club racer-cruiser and first built in 1983.

The design was originally marketed by the manufacturer as the C&C 29, but is now usually referred to as the C&C 29-2 or Mark II to differentiate it from the unrelated 1977 C&C 29 design.

Production
The design was built by C&C Yachts in Canada and the United States, from 1983 until 1986. About 400 were built, but it is now out of production.

Design

The C&C 29-2 is a racing keelboat, built predominantly of fibreglass, with wood trim. It has a masthead sloop rig with aluminum spars, a raked stem, a reverse transom, an internally mounted spade-type rudder controlled by a wheel and a fixed fin keel. It displaces  and carries  of lead ballast.

The boat is fitted with a Japanese Yanmar 2GMF diesel engine for docking and manoeuvring.

The design has sleeping accommodation for six people, with a double "V"-berth in the bow cabin, a large single quarter berth, a settee berth and a double berth located where the table folds, all in the main cabin. The galley is located on the starboard side just forward of the companionway ladder. The galley is "L"-shaped and is equipped with a two-burner stove, a top-loading ice box and a sink. The head is located just aft of the bow cabin on the port side. The design has a bow anchor locker.

Ventilation is provided by two hatches and a vent, plus there are four fixed port lights.

The fin keel version has a PHRF racing average handicap of 174 with a high of 188 and low of 171, while the shoal draft version has a PHRF racing average handicap of 177 with a high of 186 and low of 171.

Operational history

In a review of the Mark II model, Michael McGoldrick wrote, "This C&C 29 which was introduced in the early 1980s should not be confused with the much larger 29 foot model of the 1970s. This boat has an overall length of 28" 6", so it would have to be described as a slightly smallish 29 footer. It was marketed as the successor to the C&C 27 of the 1970s (which was really a 28 footer). While the C&C 29 has a comfortable and attractive interior which includes a quarter berth, it was conceived as a serious club racer that would have a favourable rating under the MORC measurement rule (Midget Ocean Racing Club). It is a good looking 29 footer that comes with a T-shaped cockpit."

In a 2004 review Darrell Nicholson wrote in Practical Sailor, "the MK II version relies more on ballast than shape when it comes to stability. Though her lead fin weighs the same 2,700 lbs. as her predecessor’s, it's thicker, straighter, and attached to a deeper stub. In addition to a ballast/displacement ratio improved from 36 to 40 percent, the new boat thus has a decidedly lower center of gravity. Though she is narrower (9' 5" beam vs. 10' 4") the MK II offers effective form stability due to relatively hard bilges that are carried well fore and aft of her midpoint. U-shaped sections in her forefoot, smooth waterlines, and a "skeg/bustle leading into the rudder also give her an underbody that helps to smooth out the "crankiness" that characterized the MK I's performance in a breeze."

See also

List of sailing boat types

Related development
C&C 29

Similar sailboats
Alberg 29
Bayfield 29 
Cal 29
Hunter 290
Island Packet 29
Mirage 29
Northwind 29
Prospect 900
Tanzer 29
Thames Marine Mirage 29
Watkins 29

References

External links

Keelboats
1980s sailboat type designs
Sailing yachts
Sailboat type designs by C&C Design
Sailboat types built by C&C Yachts